Rosebudd's Revenge is the fourth studio album by Roc Marciano. It was released on February 21, 2017 by Marci Enterprises. The album was produced by The Arch Druids, Mushroom Jesus, Modus Op, Knxwledge Animoss and Roc Marciano. Features guest appearances by his frequent collaborators Ka and Knowledge the Pirate.

Critical reception

Accolades

Track listing

References 

2017 albums
Roc Marciano albums
Fat Beats Records albums
Albums produced by Roc Marciano
Albums produced by Knxwledge